After securing a majority in the 1985 Maharashtra legislative elections, the incumbent Chief Minister Vasantdada Patil was re-appointed on 10 March 1985. Patil formed his fourth and last ministry, consisting of 7 cabinet ministers besides him. The cabinet continued for about 3 months, as Patil resigned and was replaced by Shivajirao Patil Nilangekar in June 1985.

List of ministers
The cabinet ministers in Patil's cabinet included:

References

Indian National Congress
1985 in Indian politics
P  
Cabinets established in 1985
Cabinets disestablished in 1985